Brigitte Coudrain (born 21 October 1934) is a French engraver, painter and illustrator.

In  1954 she studied in the studio of Johnny Friedlaender.

Collections
Smithsonian American Art Museum
Metropolitan Museum of Art, New York
Minneapolis Institute of Art
Cantor Arts Center, Stanford University
Ackland Art Museum
McNay Art Museum

References

1934 births
20th-century French women artists
20th-century French painters
20th-century French engravers
20th-century French illustrators
Painters from Paris
Living people